Socialism has been mentioned in several liberal democratic constitutions. It is referenced either in the form of denunciation (as is the case in the Croatian, Hungarian and Polish constitutions) or in form of construction, namely that the state in question seeks to establish a socialist society (Bangladesh, India and Portugal being an example). In these cases, the intended meaning of the term socialism can vary widely and sometimes the constitutional references to socialism are left over from a previous period in the country's history.

With the exception of India and Sri Lanka, references to socialism have been introduced by Marxist–Leninist communist parties (sometimes in collaboration with more moderate socialist parties). In India, it is used in relation to secularism. In Sri Lanka, socialist terms were introduced by the right-wing United National Party. Tanzania is the only country which considers itself to be a socialist state, having previously been a one-party state led by the Party of the Revolution (which has been in power since independence). Croatia, Hungary and Poland have references to socialism in the form of rejection of their own past communist state.

Countries governed by a single Marxist–Leninist party that have made an attempt to abolish capitalism and/or aims to implement socialism are socialist countries that are referred to as communist states. Some of these socialist states use the title of people's republic. A number of republics with liberal democratic political systems such as Algeria and Bangladesh also adopted the title.

In reference to construction

Bangladesh 

On 4 November 1972, the resolution of the Constituent Assembly of Bangladesh, dominated by the Bangladesh Awami League (AL), stated: "We promise that the ideology which inspired our freedom fighters and heroic martyrs to sacrifice their lives, viz., nationalism, socialism, democracy and secularism, these ideals shall be the main features of our Constitution". In another nod to socialism, it went on to state: "We further promise that the main objectives of our nation shall be to establish by democratic methods a socialist society free from exploitation of any kind which will ensure for every citizen the rule of law, basic human rights and political, economic and social equality, liberty and justice". Several socialist principles exist throughout the document. Article 19 provides for equality of opportunities as well as the eradication of inequalities. Article 20 provides that for every able bodied citizen work is a right, a duty and an honour while Article 20 states "from everyone according to his capacity and to everyone according to his work". Having been removed in later amendments, the original constitution stated: "A socialist economic system shall be established with a view to ensuring the attainment of a just and egalitarian society, free from exploitation of man by man. [...] The people shall own or control the instruments and means of production and distribution, and with this end in view ownership shall assume the following forms (a) state ownership, (b) cooperative ownership, and (c) private ownership".

The AL's original aim was to establish socialism. On 25 January 1975, the AL led by Bangladeshi president Sheikh Mujibur Rahman instituted a one-party system led by the Bangladesh Worker-Peasant's People's League. Rahman referred to it as the start of the Second Revolution to bring about "the democracy of the exploiting masses". Having instituted a one-party socialist state, the government went on to nationalize the media and create a people's militia. The president was killed in a coup d'état on 15 August 1975. Military strongman Ziaur Rahman amended the constitution and dropped the terms socialism and socialist from the document. During the years of military rule of Rahman (1975–1981) and Hussain Muhammad Ershad (1982–1990), state enterprises were dismantled, state subsidies withdrawn and trade liberalization and exports promoted. Contemporary Bangladesh has among the most liberalized economies of South Asia. The term socialism and socialist were reintroduced in 2011 to make the constitution more in line with the original document. However, the meaning of socialism has changed, with AL's new leader Sheikh Hasina noting that socialism was a failed system in 1991.

Guyana 
Although Guyana was a British colony until 1966, the People's Progressive Party (PPP) was established in 1950 as the country's first political party. The PPP was committed to Marxism–Leninism and was led by Cheddi Jagan. In 1957, the PPP split, officially over ideological differences. In reality, the split was along ethnic lines. The Indian community stayed in the PPP led by Jagan while the Afro-Guyanese left to establish the People's National Congress (PNC) led by Forbes Burnham. The PPP was in government until the British removed them from power in 1963 and instituted electoral changes which made it easier for Burnham's PNC to win a democratic election. The PNC won the 1968 general election, widely believed to have been rigged by the Central Intelligence Agency to ensure the defeat of the PPP.

In 1970, the government proclaimed the Co-operative Republic of Guyana based on Burnham's idea of co-operative socialism. It was billed as a peaceful revolution and its first initiative was the nationalisation of foreign-owned enterprises. Burnham described the revolution's professed goal by using the Marxist–Leninist term commanding heights of the economy, meaning the nationalisation of the largest enterprises. Scholar Ivelaw L. Griffith has noted: "By 1976, US, Canadian, and European control over the sugar and bauxite industries, banking, drug manufacturing, imports, local trade, communications, as well as other areas, had all been transferred to the state". The changes were not revolutionary and the foreign-owners were compensated. The second initiative was the creation and the development of the cooperative sector of the economy. It was planned that this sector would dominate the economy, with state and private ownership playing a lesser role. In a further nod to the Marxist–Leninist conception of the socialist state, the PNC adopted the Doctrine of Paramountcy in 1973 which stated that all governing institutions were subordinate to the party. In the words of Burnham, "[i]i is the Party hat formulates policy on the basis of its ideology, strategy and tactics. It is the Party that mobilizes, educates and appeals to the people. [...] It is the Party that then selects the members of the political government to execute the former's policy". The PNC's control of the state was strengthened by the establishment of the Office of the General Secretary of the People's National Congress and the Ministry of National Development in 1974. The Secretariat of the PNC, headed by the Office of the General Secretary, was fused into the Ministry of National Development. It was through this ministry that the PNC governed the country. The takeover of the state was followed by "socialist transformation, the harassing of the opposition and the eliminations of threats (most notably the murder of Walter Rodney), and subverting the electoral process to ensure PNC victories".

By the mid- to late 1970s, the PNC was making it clear that the country needed a new constitution. The old constitution was deemed to be "capitalist-oriented" which had entrenched "economic and associated social and political relationships which make up the framework of a capitalist society as an instrument of exploitation". The PNC had concluded that "the degree of people involvement which is possible [...] is limited. [...] They may criticise governmental action, but they do so as spectators. [...] The great forces which control the economy upon which their welfare is dependent are largely beyond their reach. [...] In effect, there is much formal democracy, but little practical democracy". In the preamble, it is stated: "WE THE PEOPLE OF THE CO-OPERATIVE REPUBLIC OF GUYANA, CONVINCED that the organisation of the State and society on socialist principles is the only means of ensuring social and economic justice for all of the people of Guyana; and, therefore, BEING MOTIVATED and guided by the principles of socialism, BEING OPPOSED to all social, economic and political systems which permit the exploitation of man by man; DO ADOPT the following-CONSTITUTION OF THE CO-OPERATIVE REPUBLIC OF GUYANA". Article 1 states that "Guyana is an indivisible, democratic sovereign state in the course of transition from capitalism to socialism" and that the principal objective of the state is "to extend socialist democracy by providing increasing opportunities for the participation of citizens in the management and decision-making processes of the State". Marxist–Leninist vocabulary are found throughout the document such as "the fullest possible satisfaction of the people's growing material, cultural and intellectual requirements, as well as the development of their personality and their socialist relations in society" and that the economy "will develop in accordance with the economic laws of socialism on the foundation of socialist relations of production and development of the production forces".

By Burnham's death on 6 August 1985, the country had moved into an authoritarian direction. At the beginning, his successor Desmond Hoyte stood by Burnham's policies, saying a couple of months after his death: "Our ultimate goal must be the same as his—creation a socialist society in the Cooperative Republic of Guyana. We must reaffirm our commitment and rededicate ourselves to the pursuit of this objective". The early 1990s saw the Hoyte government attempt to democratize society. As long as the United States was the "uncontested political hegemon, where their ideas permeated all other structures", the creation of a socialist political system was considered as untenable. In a further shift, the Hoyte government allowed for free and fair elections. The PPP is still committed to establishing a society based on Marxist–Leninist principles and "to build a socialist society and ultimately to construct a communist society". However, the PPP stopped calling for the establishment of a socialist state after the Revolutions of 1989.

India 

The Constitution of India was amended in 1976 for the 42nd time. The Indian National Congress government of Indira Gandhi changed the preamble from "sovereign democratic republic" to "sovereign socialist secular democratic republic" to emphasize the secular nature of the Indian state.

Nepal 
All the major political forces in Nepal subscribe to one form of socialism and the country's founding document stresses the importance of its socialist nature. The two largest Marxist–Leninist parties with powered help from China merged to establish the Nepal Communist Party which could not live long and split within two years of merger. The Constitution of Nepal states that "Nepal is an independent, indivisible, sovereign, secular, inclusive democratic, socialism-oriented federal democratic republican state".

Nicaragua 
The Constitution of Nicaragua stresses the importance of maintaining a socialist system and process of government.

Portugal 
Following the Carnation Revolution that put an end to the Estado Novo, a new constitution was adopted in 1976. A leftist coup had been put down on 25 November 1975 and there was much discussion nationwide on the viability of establishing a socialist system of governance. There was uncertainty in certain parts of the country that the armed forces would not respect the constitution. Likewise, many members of parliament were not committed to liberal democracy. About 60% of MPs represented leftist forces, representing either the Socialist Party, the Communist Party, the People's Socialist Front or the People's Democratic Union.

Eventually, the Constituent Assembly adopted a liberal democratic constitution. The constitution was ideologically charged and had numerous references to socialism, workers rights, the desirability of a socialist economy and it restricted private enterprise. These articles were advanced by both communist and socialists representatives. The document stated that the republic's goal was "to ensure the transition to socialism" and urged the state to "socialise the means of production and abolish the exploitation of man by man", the last phrase echoing Karl Marx's The Communist Manifesto. Also noteworthy was that workers' committees were established in enterprises and were given the right to supervise management and have their representatives elected to the boards of state-owned companies. The document was considered as a compromise and even before the constitution was passed politicians agreed that changes to the constitution would be prohibited for a five-year period (until 1981). The Democratic and Social Centre, the Portuguese party furthest to the right with representation, refused to ratify it.

The right-wing Democratic Alliance won a majority in the 1980 legislative election. However, they lacked the two-thirds majority to change the constitution alone. In the first amendments to the constitution in 1982, the governing coalition failed to remove the provisions on socialist economics. Nonetheless, these provisions had not been implemented. After the 1987 legislative election in which the right-wing party Social Democratic Party won a majority, the constitution was amended yet again. This time, most of the constitutions ideological language was eliminated and the economic restrictions put in place in the original was removed. After these amendments, there remains only one reference to socialism which states that the republic respects the people's will to "open up a path towards a socialist society", although this term is very general and ambiguous. Through these changes, the government could initiate the privatization of state-owned enterprises nationalized after the revolution.

Sri Lanka 

The first constitution of Sri Lanka, adopted on 22 May 1972, promised "the progressive advancement towards the establishment in Sri Lanka of a Socialist democracy" and to put an end to "economic and social privilege, disparity and exploitation". Despite the uprising the year earlier by the emerging Marxist–Leninist People's Liberation Front, the inclusion of the term socialist democracy did not create controversy. Another reason is that all Sri Lankan parties call themselves socialists, even the United National Party (UNP) which is considered right-wing. On that note, the UNP proposed during the 1977 parliamentary elections to establish "a mandate to draft, adopt and operate a new Republican Constitution in order to achieve the goal of a democratic socialist society". The name of the country became the Democratic Socialist Republic of Sri Lanka when the UNP proposed a new constitution which was adopted on 7 September 1978 and is still in effect. However, the constitution removed articles devoted to state ownership in the economy and instead wrote that the state seeks to establish "a democratic socialist society whose postulates recognize the coexistence of both private and public enterprise".

Tanzania 
On 26 April 1964, Tanzania became a socialist state inspired by the Marxist–Leninist model and guided by Julius Nyerere's conception of African socialism. In 1992, Tanzania introduced a multi-party system within a liberal democratic framework.

In reference to denunciation

Croatia 
The Constitution of Croatia cites the collapse of the communist system.

Hungary 
The Constitution of Hungary directly criticizes its past ruling communist regime. Based on its history, the founding document explicitly denounces its socialist past.

Poland 
The Constitution of Poland distinctly condemns all forms of totalitarian systems, including communism. It was the first of the Eastern Bloc socialist countries to begin the transition away from its past system.

List of countries

References

Footnotes

Bibliography

General 
References for when the individuals were elected to the office of CPC leader, the name of the offices and when they established and were abolished are found below:

Articles and journal entries

Books 

 

Constitutions
Republicanism
Socialism